Threshold Entertainment Group, also known as Threshold Entertainment, is an intellectual property company. Its animation subsidiary, Threshold Animation Studios, produces films. Larry Kasanoff is the company's chief executive officer (CEO) after previously serving as president for Lightstorm Entertainment, a company he co-founded with entrepreneur and filmmaker James Cameron.

Threshold Animation Studios
Threshold Animation Studios has produced several CGI projects:

Theme park films
DC Comics' Justice League (still in production)
Star Trek 4D – Las Vegas Hilton
Armageddon – Les Effets Speciaux – Disneyland Paris
Mission: Space – Epcot's Walt Disney World Resort
Hershey's Really Big 3D Show – Hershey's Chocolate World
Bob the Builder 4D – Legoland
Marvel Super Heroes 4D – Madame Tussauds
Justice League: Alien Invasion 3D – animations for the amusement ride at Warner Bros. Movie World

Television specials
Lego Star Wars: The Empire Strikes Out – Cartoon Network
Lego: Atlantis – Cartoon Network
The Afterlife – animated comedy pilot for Fox

Films
Bobbleheads: The Movie – released on home video by Universal Studios in December 2020.
Foodfight! – released on DVD in the United States on May 7, 2013. 
 Lego: The Adventures of Clutch Powers – released by Universal Studios in 2010.
Bionicle: The Legend Reborn – released on home video by Universal Studios in September 2009.
Hero Factory's Rise of the Rookies – premiered on Nickelodeon, released on DVD by Warner Home Video.
Mortal Kombat: Annihilation – released in the United States on November 21, 1997.
Mortal Kombat – released in the United States on August 18, 1995.

Contributions to other media
Win a Date with Tad Hamilton!
Mortal Kombat: Annihilation
Scary Movie
I Still Know What You Did Last Summer
The Faculty
Dogma
Edwurd Fudwupper Fibbed Big
Jay and Silent Bob Strike Back
Ace Ventura: Pet Detective
Highlander: Endgame
Gen Y Cops
Impostor
The Weight of Water
From Dusk 'til Dawn 3
The Producer
Where Are The Toons Now

References

External links
 

American animation studios
Mass media companies of the United States